is a Japanese anime television series produced by Production I.G. The series is a co-production between Crunchyroll and Adult Swim. The series first premiered from August to October 2021, on both Adult Swim and Crunchyroll, ahead of its broadcast in Japan, which aired from October to December 2021.

Plot
The synopsis of the series was published by Crunchyroll:

Characters

Protagonists

An eighteen-year-old, pale-skinned princess with white blonde hair who was set adrift ten years ago by a younger Yukimaru the day her father's ship was attacked. Upon arriving on the island of Shangri-La, she is taken in by some people of a brothel. She is nicknamed the "White Marginal" in Shangri-La because of her white skin and hair. She is a positive, cheerful orphan despite her traumatic past. Years later, Fena sold herself into a marriage to an ill-tempered, abusive British soldier named Maxiver Jr. in an attempt to steal the money to escape the island. Her plan failed until she was rescued by Salman and Otto and by the Samurai Seven including Yukimaru. 

A platinum white dog that lived on Shangri-La. When Fena was rescued from Maxiver Jr.'s men on Shangri-La, Brule followed Fena and has since become a companion to her and the Samurai Seven.

Samurai Seven
The  are a group of elite samurai that resides on Goblin Island, and Fena as her loyal pirate crew. They are the descendants of the Goblin Knights that decimated 3,000 Spanish soldiers at the Battle of Dunkirk and were "feared as the incarnation of Lucifer himself".

An introverted masked samurai and the leader of the Samurai Seven, who helps to rescue Fena and works to keep her safe. Ten years ago when Yukimaru was a young boy, he helped to evacuate Fena during an attack by the Rumble Rose and the Royal Navy. He was later rescued by Kei, who trained him to be a samurai.

A samurai who wields a bow and arrow, he is an elite warrior who can kill with his bow and arrow or his looks. While on the surface he may seem aloof, Shitan greatly values his friends.

A samurai who is the only female member of the group, she has a tendency to geek over different technologies and is shown to wield pistols and musket rifles where she possesses good marksmanship.

A samurai and Kaede's older twin brother who wields a spear and wakizashi. While they're both friendly and mischievous, Enju feels he's more dependable than his younger brother.

A samurai and Enju's younger twin brother who wields a spear and wakizashi. While they're both friendly and mischievous, Kaede feels he's more manly than his elder brother.

A samurai who wields a short ninja sword, he is the oldest and most mature of the group, manages everyone's wild energy. Tsubaki is also an expert cook and once taught Fena how to make kobiru.

A samurai who fights with brass knuckles, he is the largest and strongest of the group. When he's not fighting, Makaba is kind-hearted and mild-mannered.

Antagonists

Rumble Rose
The  is a band of pirates led by O'Malley who are partially responsible for the attack on the ship ten years ago that led to the death of Fena's father. They also allied with Abel to partly obtain Fena for him and partly to get the coordinates to El Dorado. Each of its high-ranking female members have names similar to the famous female pirates and/or Navy members in history. 

The female captain of the Rumble Rose with red hair and an eyepatch over her closed right eye who despite her beautiful appearance, she has a strong and arrogant personality that hates to lose. At the request of Abel Bluefield, she is aiming a party for Fena. 

A high-ranking female member of the Rumble Rose, she is a staff member who is always calm and is also called O'Malley's right arm. Ching is good at physical attacks and has large sword wound on her left eye.

A high-ranking female member of the Rumble Rose, with a rapier and being crescent sword user, she has a dark personality, contrary to her cute appearance. Charlotte is most adored by O'Malley among the sailors.

A high-ranking female member of the Rumble Rose, she is a mood maker and troublemaker for the crew, has a good physique, and has a bright and optimistic personality, but her temper becomes rough during battle.

A high-ranking female member of the Rumble Rose. Although she is quite short, she has a high ability as a sniper, looks up to O'Malley, and wears an eyepatch over her left eye. 

A high-ranking female member of the Rumble Rose, she has a dignified and neat appearance, but her pride is high and she is vicious, and fights mightily with a dagger.

A high-ranking female member of the Rumble Rose, she has a muscular body and great strength. Anne's fighting style is war-like, but she is reliable in the crew. She wields a war hammer.

A high-ranking female member of the Rumble Rose, she is very slender and has a mysterious atmosphere. Alvida is also good at outsmarting cowardly opponents.

Royal Navy
A branch of the British Empire's military and is one of the factions after Fena ever since they were partially responsible for the attack on the ship ten years ago that led to the death of Fena's father. Among its known personnel are:

A mysterious lord who is after Fena for his own reasons and searches for her on his ship called the Blue Giant. One of them is that he fell in love with Fena's late mother Helena and knows what her family can do. He allies with the Rumble Rose to find Fena.

Abel's subordinate, he was originally a slave on Shangri-La before being rescued by Abel. Since then, Cody has been loyal to Abel.

The unnamed captain of the Blue Giant who is loyal to Abel.

Supporting characters

An older knight who helps to rescue Fena from her fate. He was once nicknamed "Salman the Onslaught" for having killed his enemies with a spear and knew Fena when she was a little girl.

An older knight who helps to rescue Fena from her fate. He was once nicknamed "Otto the Blitz" for his quick swordplay and knew Fena when she was a little girl.

The leader of a Japanese community on Goblin Island and Shitan's uncle, he is the one that provides the Samurai Seven to Fena in her quest and even gave Fena a stone that her father wanted her to have. Though he later sent a message to the Samurai Seven to leave Fena once she has served her purpose as he sends Kei to recover Fena.

A samurai and Shitan's older brother who was responsible for rescuing Yukimaru and training him. Kei has become like a brother figure to him. Sanada later dispatched Kei to recover Fena.

Other characters

A noble Dutchman who was the head of the Houtman family and had ties to Eden. He pretended to be a butler of the king of England to help Helena to fulfill her task: to seduce the king to make the new La Pucelle/maiden. After that, Franz eloped with Helena and raised Fena as his adoptive daughter. He was killed during a raid by the Rumble Rose and British Army. Before dying and helping a younger Fena set her adrift in a lifeboat, he told her to find "Eden".

A prostitute residing on Shangri-La. She is a co-worker and friend of Fena. Fena has shown her multiple times her escape plans over the years. Angie had a crush on Abel, which she flustered every time she seeing him. However, after learning of Abel's obsession with his past, she decided helping Fena to find Eden.

A noble Frenchwoman who was a former maiden, a descendant of Joan of Arc, and the mother of Fena. She was the old childhood friend and lover of Abel. She had blue eyes and had platinum blond ankle-length hair. She came to England on a mission to seduce the king and to produce the new La Pucelle. Together with Franz, who pretended to be the king's butler to aid Helena's task, Helena ran away to a safer country.

Production and release
The series was directed by ToyGerPROJECT, Kazuto Nakazawa, Tetsuya Takahashi, and Saki Fujii. Asako Kuboyama penned the series' scripts, while Yuki Kajiura composed the music. The opening theme is  performed by JUNNA, while the ending theme is  performed by Minori Suzuki.

The English dub aired on Adult Swim's Toonami programming block, and was streamed in Japanese with subtitles on Crunchyroll, from August 15 to October 24, 2021; with the first two episodes premiering back-to-back. In Japan, the series aired from October 3 to December 19, 2021 on MBS, Tokyo MX, BS Asahi, and AT-X. In Southeast Asia, the series premiered on May 2, 2022 on Animax.

On September 28, 2022, Jason DeMarco confirmed that the series was written off by Warner Bros. Discovery after it had been removed from Adult Swim's website.

Reception
The series received a mixed reception. Rafael Motomayor, writing for IGN, gave it a 7 out of 10, praising the high production values and quality of animation, but criticizing the poor writing and convoluted ending. Hilary Leung, writing for CBR, also praised the animation quality and setup, noting that "the character designs, animation style and plot are highly reminiscent of anime from the '90s to early '00s, hitting all the right nostalgic notes for fans of that era", but was less impressed by the inconsistent tones and pacing of the series.

Notes

References

External links
  
 

2021 anime television series debuts
Action anime and manga
Adult Swim original programming
Adventure anime and manga
Alternate history anime
Anime composed by Yuki Kajiura
Anime with original screenplays
Crunchyroll anime
Crunchyroll Originals
Fantasy anime and manga
Fictional works set in the Pacific Ocean
Mainichi Broadcasting System original programming
Pirates in anime and manga
Production I.G
Television series about pirates
Television series set in the 18th century
Toonami